Fraxinea is a specific epithet and may refer to:

Perenniporia fraxinea, a plant pathogen
Ramalina fraxinea,  a lichen
Weinmannia fraxinea,  a tree in the family Cunoniaceae